Gârda may refer to:

 Gârda de Sus, a commune in Alba County, Romania
 Gârda Seacă, a village in Gârda de Sus Commune, Alba County, Romania
 Gârda-Bărbulești, a village in Roșia Montană Commune, Alba County, Romania
 Gârda Seacă, a tributary of the Arieșul Mare River in Romania

Others 
 Gârde, a village in Bistra Commune, Alba County, Romania

See also 
 Garda (disambiguation)
 Gârdești (disambiguation)